Enterococcus pseudoavium is a species of Enterococcus.

References

Further reading
Epidemiology of Enterococcus: 
Remy, K., and P. Galiatsatos. "Enterococcus Pseudoavium Sepsis In A 50 Year Old Male With B Cell Lymphoma." Am J Respir Crit Care Med 185 (2012): A4597.
Goh, Swee Han, et al. "Identification of Enterococcus Species and Phenotypically Similar Lactococcus and Vagococcus Species by Reverse Checkerboard Hybridization to Chaperonin 60 Gene Sequences." Journal of Clinical Microbiology 38.11 (2000): 3953–3959.

External links

LPSN
Type strain of Enterococcus pseudoavium at BacDive -  the Bacterial Diversity Metadatabase

pseudoavium
Bacteria described in 1989